Gladowshöhe is a village and a civil parish (Ortsteil) of the German town of Strausberg, located in the district of Märkisch-Oderland in Brandenburg. As of 2007 its population was of 217.

History
The place developed between 1904 and 1906 on the boundaries of the landowner Ferdinand Gladow, which let also measure this range and after that the place was designated. Village's name means "Gladow's Height".

Geography
Gladowshöhe is located in the south-eastern area of Strausberg, few km to the western borders of the Märkische Schweiz Nature Park, on a road linking Rehfelde and Garzau-Garzin to Hohenstein.

See also
Strausberg
Hohenstein
Ruhlsdorf

References

External links

 Gladowshöhe website

Villages in Brandenburg
Strausberg
Former municipalities in Brandenburg
Populated places established in 1904